Etos B.V., trading as Etos, was founded in 1919 by Philips to create a grocery and drugstore where Philips employees could benefit from lower priced products than the average stores. "Etos" is an abbreviation for the Dutch words: Eendracht, Toewijding, Overleg and Samenwerking (Unity, Devotion, Consultation and Cooperation). As of July 1, 2021, Sebastiaan de Jong will be the company's president.

History 

Etos had a bakery and even fuel pumps, in 1931 the stores went private as Etos.

In 1973 Etos was bought by Ahold which reformed the grocery stores to the Albert Heijn formula. The drug stores went on as Etos.

Etos has 546 stores in the Netherlands. 54% of the Etos stores operates as a franchise.

In 2008 Etos was named best drug store of the Netherlands for the first time (the first 11 years this had been drug store "DA"). In 2009, 2011, 2014, 2015 and 2017 it managed to extend this title.

References

External links
  Official website of Etos

Ahold Delhaize
Retail companies of the Netherlands
Retail companies established in 1918
Pharmacy brands
Dutch companies established in 1918